Gayanthika Artigala Thushari Abeyratne (born 23 December 1986) is a Sri Lankan middle-distance runner. She won a gold medal at the 2017 Asian Indoor and Martial Arts Games and silver at the 2017 Asian Championships. She currently holds her country's national record in the 800 metres.

International competitions

Personal bests

Outdoor
400 metres – 55.62 (Colombo 2014)
800 metres – 2:02.55 (Diyagama 2017) NR
1500 metres – 4:18.7 (Jaffna 2016)
5000 metres – 17:00.46 (Diyagama 2011)
Indoor
800 metres – 2:05.12 (Ashgabat 2017)

References

External links 
 

1986 births
Living people
People from Southern Province, Sri Lanka
Sri Lankan female middle-distance runners
Sri Lankan female cross country runners
Asian Games competitors for Sri Lanka
Athletes (track and field) at the 2014 Asian Games
Athletes (track and field) at the 2018 Asian Games
Commonwealth Games competitors for Sri Lanka
Athletes (track and field) at the 2018 Commonwealth Games
South Asian Games medalists in athletics
South Asian Games silver medalists for Sri Lanka
Asian Indoor Athletics Championships winners
20th-century Sri Lankan women
21st-century Sri Lankan women